Friendly Fire Recordings is an independent record label based in Brooklyn that was founded by Dan Koplowitz in 2004. Bands under the label include Asobi Seksu, Faunts and David & the Citizens. Friendly Fire is distributed in the United States by Redeye Distribution and in Canada by Outside Music. The digital distribution is handled by Independent Online Distribution Alliance.

Artists
Asobi Seksu
Camphor
David & the Citizens
Elk City
Faunts
The Old Soul
The Whitsundays
Treefight for Sunlight

Catalog
FFR-001 - Asobi Seksu - Asobi Seksu (2004)
FFR-002 - Faunts - High Expectations/Low Results (2005)
FFR-003 - David & the Citizens - David & the Citizens EP (2005)
FFR-004 - Asobi Seksu - Citrus (2006)
FFR-005 - David & the Citizens - Until the Sadness is Gone (2006)
FFR-006 - Elk City - New Believers (2007)
FFR-007 - The Old Soul - The Old Soul (2007)
FFR-008 - The Whitsundays - The Whitsundays (2008)
FFR-009 - Camphor - Drawn to Dust (2008)
FFR-010 - Windmill - Puddle City Racing Lights (2008)
FFR-011 - Asobi Seksu - Citrus LP (2008)
FFRD-001 - Faunts - M4 EP (2008) Extremely Limited Stock
FFR-012 - Faunts - Feel.Love.Thinking.Of (2009)
FFRD-018 - Treefight for Sunlight - A Collection of Vibrations for Your Skull (2011)

See also
 List of record labels

External links
Official website
Interview with The Whitsundays at StereoSubversion.com
Interview with Elk City at StereoSubversion.com

Record labels established in 2004
Indie rock record labels
American independent record labels
Alternative rock record labels